Blowzabella is an English folk band formed in London in 1978. The band currently consists of Andy Cutting, Jo Freya, Paul James, David Shepherd, Barn Stradling, and Jon Swayne; members of the band have changed multiple times since their inception, with Jon Swayne being the only remaining original band member. It is estimated that Blowzabella musicians played between 26 and 32 instruments in total, which include bagpipes, hurdy-gurdy, diatonic button accordion, alto sax, and triangle. Their music is heavily influenced by English and European traditional folk music, and has inspired a variety of European folk bands with their unique style and sound. Many European folk artists attribute Blowzabella as a major influence in their music.

Current members 

 Andy Cutting (diatonic button accordion)
 Jo Freya (clarinet, saxophone, vocals)
 Paul James (bagpipes, saxophone, vocals)
 David Shepherd (violin)
 Barn Stradling (bass guitar)
 Jon Swayne (bagpipes, saxophone)
Source:

History
Blowzabella was formed in Whitechapel, London in 1978 by original members Bill O'Toole, Jon Swayne, Sam Palmer, Chris Gunstone, and Dave Armitage. When the band first formed, Swayne, O'Toole, and Armitage were studying woodwind instrument making at the London College of Furniture, while Palmer had recently finished the course and had already began a career making hurdy-gurdies. During this time period, Swayne, Armitage, and Palmer lived together at the Fieldgate Mansions in Whitechapel which were the band's headquarters after Swayne finished college in Somerset. Gunstone was living in Blackheath, and was heavily involved in Balkan music and dance.

Naming the band 
The band's name was taken from an 18th century English bagpipe jig "Blowzabella, My Bouncing Doxie", an elaboration of a popular 16th century Italian theme. Blowzabella as a character appeared in Thomas D'Urfy's 1719 work Wit and Mirth or Pills to Purge Melancholy under the title "The Italian Song Call'd Pastorella; made into an English Dialogue", and in his earlier 1619 play The Rise and Fall of Massaniello. Bill O'Toole and Jon Swayne discovered the tune while researching for bagpipe repertoire in the Vaughan Williams Memorial Library and thought the name, with its alliterative "blow" and "bella" descriptive, perfectly summed up the band's sound.

Early years 
In late 1979, Bill O'Toole formed the band Sirocco in Australia. That same year, original member Chris Gunstone formed Goat Bag Records and the Macedonian Early Music Band. The Band's first release, "17 Macedonian Folk Dances", rose to #8 in the Melody Maker Folk Album charts. He also created the Macedonian group Izvoren; Jon Swayne (Macedonian bagpipe), Dave Roberts (tanbura), and Dave Armitage (tapan drum) would later feature in Blowzabella. Gunstone then formed another group, The Trio, with Paul James (bagpipes, woodwind) and Cliff Stapleton (hurdy-gurdy), which played for the grand opening of the New Covent Garden Market in early 1980. The Trio had become full-time musicians, regularly performing at Covent Garden Market and in St. Paul's Cathedral Portico. Paul James simultaneously formed Dr. Cowsgill, also represented by Goat Bag Records. Upon suggestion by Dave Armitage, Gunstone invited his Trio to join Blowzabella in late January 1981, thereby creating a unique wall of sound by performing with two bagpipes and two hurdy-gurdy. Blowzabella and Izvoren both performed at the St Chartier Hurdy-Gurdy and Bagpipe Makers Festival in France July 1981 televised by French channel TF1.

Blowzabella booked their first series of performances playing with the London French folk dance group L'escargot. The band had success playing fairs and festivals in southern England and East Anglia, where their unusual performances and unique style quickly made them popular. The band performed at the Hood and Albion Fairs, later taking their show to Switzerland's Nyon Folk Festival and the Trowbridge Village Pump Festival in 1980 and 1982, respectively. Band member Bill O'Toole created and revived an English bagpipe for his use in these and other performances, which was inspired by medieval English church artwork and carvings. O'Toole also added stilt walking to the group's performances, and all members except the hurdy-gurdy player could be seen playing above the crowds.

In the studio 

 1981: Dave Armitage leaves the band. Original member Paul James devises a way for the band to finance their own record by foregoing four concert fees and paying the recording studio instead. Displeased with his limited role in Blowzabella and frequently in conflict with Cliff Stapleton, Paul James threatened to leave Blowzabella in late 1981. Dave Armitage (bass-curtal) rejoined Blowzabella for a brief period along with Dave Shepherd (fiddle, five-string fiddle, viola d'amore), who had previously played in bands with Dave Roberts and Paul James. Chris Gunstone, the "guiding spirit" of the band, left the band in September 1982, becoming manager of Robert Mandel's East European Folk group (EEF)  featuring Marta Sebestyen from Hungary. He also became the sole acting manager of Blowzabella. Gunstone kept his commitment to three months' radio appearances on BBC Radio World Service promoting Blowzabella's first hit LP and booked the band several international festival appearances for the following year. Blowzabella then turned their focus to folk venues to sell their albums. 
 1982: Blowzabella records their first album, eponymously titled Blowzabella, at Dave Pegg's Woodworm Records (engineer Mark Powell) with Chris Gunstone, Dave Roberts, Sam Palmer, Cliff Stapleton, and Jon Swayne. The album is co-produced by Gunstone and James (and Swayne on his tracks A2 and B3) and reaches No. 4 in the Melody Maker Folk Album Charts in August; a breakthrough album for bagpipes other than Irish that had dominated the UK folk Charts for a decade.
 1983: Blowzabella records the album In Colour featuring "the Daves" (Armitage, Roberts, and Shepard), Paul James, Sam Palmer, Cliff Stapleton, and Jon Swayne. Guest performers included Max Johnson, Dave Mitchell, John Spires (of the Dead Sea Surfers) and Clash and Generation X drummer Terry Chimes. The band tours to Vancouver and Winnipeg folk festivals. Samuel Palmer leaves the band by year's end.
 1984: The band records albums Tam Lin, featuring Frankie Armstrong and Brian Pearson, and Bobbityshooty with Armitage, James, Roberts, Shepherd, Stapleton and Swayne. 
 1985: Armitage and Stapleton leave Blowzabella; Nigel Eaton (hurdy-gurdy) and Ian Luff (bass guitar, cittern, mandola, darabuka) join the band.
 1986: The Blowzabella Wall of Sound is recorded with Eaton, James, Luff, Roberts, Shepherd and Swayne.
 1987: Blowzabella records the live album Pingha Frenzy while on tour in Brazil for the British Council with Eaton, James, Luff, Roberts and Shepherd. Jo Freya (vocals, saxophone, clarinet) joins Blowzabella (credited as Jo Fraser).
 1988: Jon Swayne returns to the band. Gunstone writes to Plant Life Records in 1988 suggesting a 10th Anniversary album but receives no response. 
 1989: Andy Cutting (diatonic button accordion) joins the band and appears on the album Vanilla (1990) with Eaton, Freya, James, Luff and Swayne. Nigel Eaton (hurdy-gurdy) later played on tour with Led Zeppelin from 1994–96, appearing on their live No Quarter album.

Band dissolution and reunion 
In late 1990, the pressure of constant touring led to a hiatus for Blowzabella. In 1996, Dave Roberts died. The line-up of Luff, Cutting, Swayne, Eaton, and Shepherd played a small number of performances from 1995 to 2001. In 2002, James proposed the band reform, and organized performances to celebrate Blowzabella's upcoming 25th anniversary. Cutting, Eaton, Freya, James, Luff, Shepherd, and Swayne played several festivals and performed together at a 25-year reunion concert in Bath in September 2003, with guest appearances by Dave Armitage, Bill O'Toole, and Sam Palmer. Gunstone initially accepted James' 25th reunion concert invitation, but later withdrew. At the end of 2004, Eaton left the band and was replaced by Gregory Jolivet, from Bourges, France. In December 2005, Luff left Blowzabella and was replaced by Barnaby Stradling on bass guitar.

Recent changes 
Since January 2006, the line-up has broadly remained the same. In July 2007, the band released the album Octomento, their first album of new material since 1990. This was followed in June 2010 by the live album Dance, an album of new and traditional material Strange News in October 2013, and Two Score in 2018. Jolivet left the band in August 2020, due to problems caused by Brexit and the COVID-19 pandemic. The band continues to compose, record, and perform live (as of 2020).

Discography

In 2009, "Fulmine" from Vanilla was included in Topic Records 70-year anniversary boxed set Three Score and Ten as track 21 on the seventh CD.

References

Sources
 Encyclopedia Blowzabellica - The Blowzabella Tune & Dance Book. Dragonfly Music, 1987.
 Encyclopedia Blowzabellica - The Blowzabella Tune & Dance Book. Second edition. Blowzabella, 2010. 
 Blowzabella. New Tunes for Dancing. Blowzabella, 2004.

External links
 Official website

English folk musical groups
British world music groups
Musical groups established in 1978
Musical groups from London
1978 establishments in England
Topic Records artists